, is a Japanese futsal player who plays for Nagoya Oceans and the Japanese national futsal team.

Clubs 
 2004-2009  Fugador Sumida
 2009-2010  Bardral Urayasu
 2010-2011  UD Guadalajara FS
 2011-2012  FS García
 2012  Al-Rayyan SC
 2012-2018  Bardral Urayasu
 2018-  Nagoya Oceans

Titles

Club 
 F.League (1)
 2018-19
 All Japan Futsal Championship (2)
 2018, 2019
 F.League Ocean Cup (2)
 2018, 2019

Individual 
 F.League Best 5 (1)
 2014-15

References

External links
 FIFA profile
 

1985 births
Living people
Futsal forwards
Japanese men's futsal players
Place of birth missing (living people)
Bardral Urayasu players
Nagoya Oceans players